Cyrtodactylus angularis, also known commonly as the angulated bow-fingered gecko or the angled forest gecko, is a species of lizard in the family Gekkonidae. The species is endemic to Thailand.

Geographic range
C. angularis is known from Saraburi Province, Thailand.

Reproduction
C. angularis is oviparous.

References

Further reading
Smith MA (1921). "New or Little-known Reptiles and Batrachians from Southern Annam (Indo-China)". Proceedings of the Zoological Society of London 1921: 423–440. (Gymnodactylus peguensis Var. angularis, new variety, pp. 427–428, Text-figure 1C).
Smith MA (1935). The Fauna of British India, Including Ceylon and Burma. Reptilia and Amphibia. Vol. II.—Sauria. London: Secretary of State for India in Council. (Taylor and Francis, printers). xiii + 440 pp. + Plate I + 2 maps. (Gymnodactylus angularis, p. 52).
Underwood G (1954). "On the classification and evolution of geckos". Proc. Zool. Soc. London 124 (3): 469–492. (Cyrtodactylus angularis, new combination, p. 475).

Cyrtodactylus
Reptiles described in 1921